12/9 may refer to:
December 9 (month-day date notation)
September 12 (day-month date notation)
12 shillings and 9 pence in UK predecimal currency

See also
129 (disambiguation)
9/12 (disambiguation)